Priah Nicole Ferguson (born October 1, 2006) is an American actress. She is best known for her role as Erica Sinclair on the Netflix's series Stranger Things.

Early life
Ferguson was born on October 1, 2006, in Atlanta, Georgia, to John and Adjua Ferguson.

Career
Ferguson was motivated to start acting after watching the films Crooklyn and Daddy's Little Girls. In 2015, she began acting in locally-produced short and independent films.

In 2016, she made her television debut on the FX Networks show Atlanta and the Civil War drama Mercy Street. In 2017, Ferguson was cast in the Netflix science fiction horror series Stranger Things as Erica Sinclair, the younger sister of Lucas Sinclair, portrayed by Caleb McLaughlin. She was promoted to series regular after recurring in previous seasons. 

In 2018, she appeared in the film The Oath. She appeared in the 2022 Halloween comedy The Curse of Bridge Hollow (formerly titled Boo!) alongside Marlon Wayans.

In 2023, Ferguson voiced a intelligent, sassy, and quick witted character named Lisa, who is one of the protagonists of My Dad the Bounty Hunter.

Philanthropy
In 2015, Ferguson partnered with United Way in an effort to bring attention to child well-being.

Filmography

Film

Television

References

External links

2006 births
21st-century American actresses
African-American actresses
African-American child actresses
American child actresses
American film actresses
American television actresses
Living people
Actresses from Atlanta
21st-century African-American women
21st-century African-American people